Folk Matinee is a studio album by the American folk music group, The Limeliters, a trio made up of Lou Gottlieb, Alex Hassilev, and Glenn Yarbrough. It was released in 1962 on the RCA Victor label (catalog no. LSP-2547).

The album debuted on Billboard magazine's Top 40 pop album chart on October 13, 1962, peaked at No. 21, and remained on the chart for six weeks.

AllMusic gave the album a rating of four-and-a-half stars. Reviewer Cary Ginell wrote that the eclectic album was "not their best, but this studio album does have its moments."

Track listing
Side A
 "Sing Hallelujah" [2:06]
 "Sweet Water Rolling" [2:28]
 "Funk" [2:15]
 "Blue Mountain Lake" [2:11]
 "Tamborito" [2:07]
 "Uncle Benny's Celebration" [2:19

Side B
 "Wake Up, Dunia" [2:06]
 "Die Gedanken Sind Frei" [2:07]
 "To Everything There Is A Season (Turn! Turn! Turn!)" [2:09]
 "Reedy River" [2:49]
 "Those Were The Days" [3:06]
 "The Minstrel Boy" [2:11]

References

1962 albums
The Limeliters albums